Darian Kinnard (born December 29, 1999) is an American football offensive tackle for the Kansas City Chiefs of the National Football League (NFL). He played college football at Kentucky.

Early life and high school
Kinnard was born in Youngstown, Ohio, and grew up in Knoxville, Tennessee, and  then Kingsport, Tennessee, where he attended Dobyns-Bennett High School. He moved to Cleveland, Ohio, after his freshman year and enrolled at Saint Ignatius High School. Kinnard played in the 2018 All-American Bowl. Kinnard committed to play college football at Kentucky over offers from Penn State, UCLA and Tennessee.

College career
Kinnard played in nine games and started two games as a true freshman. He started all 13 of the Wildcats games at right tackle in his sophomore season. He was named preaseason All-Southeastern Conference as well as a preseason All-American by CBS going into his junior season.

Professional career

Kinnard was drafted by the Kansas City Chiefs in the fifth round, 145th overall, of the 2022 NFL Draft. Kinard won Super Bowl LVII when the Chiefs defeated the Philadelphia Eagles.

References

External links
 Kansas City Chiefs bio
Kentucky Wildcats bio

1999 births
Living people
Players of American football from Youngstown, Ohio
Players of American football from Knoxville, Tennessee
American football offensive tackles
Kentucky Wildcats football players
All-American college football players
Kansas City Chiefs players